The  is an AC/DC dual-voltage electric multiple unit (EMU) train type operated by East Japan Railway Company (JR East) in Japan on limited express services since 1997.

Variants
 E653-0 series: Original (eight 7-car and four 4-car) AC/DC sets built from 1997 for use on Joban Line Fresh Hitachi limited express services
 E653-1000 series: 7-car sets modified from E653-0 series between 2013 and 2014 for use on Inaho limited express services from September 2013
 E653-1100 series: 4-car sets modified from E653-0 series between 2014 and 2015 for use on Shirayuki limited express services from March 2015

Operations

1997-2013 Fresh Hitachi

2013- Inaho
From the start of the revised timetable on 28 September 2013, reformed E653 series sets displaced from Fresh Hitachi services by new E657 series sets were phased in on Inaho services operating between Niigata and Akita, replacing JNR-era 485 series EMUs and reclassified E653-1000 series. The Inaho fleet consists of eight seven-car E653-1000 series sets modified with the addition of a Green (first class) car and a new livery evoking images of the sunset, rice plants, and the sea.

2015- Shirayuki

Formations
, the fleet consists of eight seven-car sets (U101 to U108) and four four-car sets (H201 to H204), all based at Niigata Depot.

Inaho E653-1000 series 7-car sets U101–U108
The reformed seven-car Inaho E653-1000 series sets (U101 to U108) are based at Niigata Depot and formed as follows, with four motored ("M") cars and three non-powered trailer ("T") cars, and car 1 at the Akita (northern) end.

 Cars 2 and 5 each have one PS32 single-arm pantograph.
 Cars 1, 3, 4, and 6 have toilets.

Shirayuki E653-1100 series 4-car sets H201–H204
The reformed four-car Shirayuki E653-1100 series sets (H201 to H204) are formed as follows, with two motored ("M") cars and two non-powered trailer ("T") cars, and car 1 at the Arai end.

Car 2 is equipped with one PS32 single-arm pantograph.

Original (Fresh Hitachi) 7-car sets K301–K308
The original Fresh Hitachi seven-car sets were formed as follows, with car 1 at the south (Ueno) end.

 Cars 2 and 5 each had one PS32 single-arm pantograph.
 Cars 1, 3, 4, and 6 had toilets.

Original (Fresh Hitachi) 4-car sets K351–K354
The original Fresh Hitachi four-car sets were formed as follows, with car 8 at the south (Ueno) end.

Car 9 was equipped with one PS32 single-arm pantograph.

Interior

E653-0 series
All cars in the original E653-0 series sets were standard class with 2+2 seating and  seat pitch.

E653-1000 series
The Green (first class) cars in E653-1000 series sets have 2+1 seating, arranged with pairs of seats on the seaward side and single seats on the landward side. The Green car seats 18 passengers.

History
E653 series were introduced from 1 October 1997. The refreshment vending machines were discontinued from 31 March 2008.

From 17 March 2012, the E653 series trains were gradually phased out from Fresh Hitachi services with the introduction of new E657 series ten-car EMUs. These plans were abandoned following the suspension of services north of Iwaki on the Joban Line after the 2011 Tohoku earthquake and tsunami.

From the start of the revised timetable on 28 September 2013, reformed E653-1000 series seven-car sets were introduced on Inaho services, operating between Niigata and Akita. Set U102 was the first E653-1000 series to enter revenue service, being used on a special  charter service between Niigata and Sakata on 14 September 2013.

These sets received a new livery consisting of ivory white with vermillion and blue stripes intended to evoke an image of the sunset over the Sea of Japan. The interiors were refitted with new seat covers, similar to those used in the E7 series and W7 series shinkansen trains.

E653-1000 series livery changes
The fleet of E653-1000 series sets used on Inaho services is undergoing a programme of reliverying beginning in 2017, with sets each receiving different colour liveries. Set U106 received an all-over ultramarine livery, returning to service in October 2017, and set U107 received an all-over deep pink livery, returning to service in December 2017.

Fleet histories
The manufacturers and build dates for the fleet are as shown below.

7-car sets

4-car sets

References

External links

  

Electric multiple units of Japan
East Japan Railway Company
Train-related introductions in 1997
Hitachi multiple units
20 kV AC multiple units
1500 V DC multiple units of Japan
Kinki Sharyo multiple units
Tokyu Car multiple units